Konovalovo is a rural locality (a selo) in Volokonovsky District, Belgorod Oblast, Russia. The population was 236 as of 2010. There are 4 streets.

Geography 
Konovalovo is located 30 km southwest of Volokonovka (the district's administrative centre) by road. Plotovka is the nearest rural locality.

References 

Rural localities in Volokonovsky District